Mount Conness is a  mountain in the Sierra Nevada range, to the west of the Hall Natural Area. Conness is on the boundary between the Inyo National Forest and Yosemite National Park. The Conness Glacier lies north of the summit.

History 
Mount Conness is named for John Conness (1821–1909), a native of Ireland who came to United States in 1836. Conness was a member of California legislature (1853–1854, 1860–1861) and the United States Senator from California (1863–1869). He resided in Massachusetts from 1869 until his death in 1909.

In 1860 Josiah Dwight Whitney, Jr. was appointed State Geologist of California and he organized the California Geological Survey (1863–1870). Whitney, along with William H. Brewer, Clarence King, James T. Gardiner, Charles F. Hoffmann, Lorenzo G. Yates, Richard D. Cotter and others, made an extensive survey of California, including the Sierra Nevada and Yosemite region. Whitney wrote:

"Mount Conness bears the name of a distinguished citizen of California, now a United States Senator, who deserves more than any other person, the credit of carrying the bill, organizing the Geological Survey of California, through the Legislature, and who is chiefly to be credited for another great scientific work, the Survey of the 40th Parallel."

Clarence King, a geologist for the Survey and the first to ascend Mount Conness along with James T. Gardiner in 1864, wrote:

"I recognized the old familiar summit... and that firm peak with titan strength and brow so square and solid, it seems altogether natural we should have named it for California’s statesman, John Conness."

Climbing 
Conness is a training ground for alpine climbing since it utilizes all aspects of mountaineering: trails, scrambling, and glacier trekking; all at a high altitude for California. Usually climbers camp near Tioga Pass and begin the climb at dawn. It takes about a full day to summit.

The summit block consists of  scrambling along a knife edge ridge leading to the summit consisting of views to the east of the Conness Glacier and to the west toward Tuolumne Meadows.

References

External links 

 
 
 
 
 

Mountains of Yosemite National Park
Mountains of Mono County, California
Mountains of Tuolumne County, California
Mountains of Northern California
North American 3000 m summits